Another Dawn (Spanish:  amanecer) is a 1943 Mexican thriller film directed by Julio Bracho and starring Andrea Palma, Pedro Armendáriz and Alberto Galán. The film's sets were designed by the art director Jorge Fernandez.

Plot
A politician, Octavio, has discovered damaging information about the regional Governor who has recently crushed a strike at the urging of "foreign interests". Octavio is hunted by the Governor's bodyguards who wish to kill him and recover the documents he has stolen. While hiding in a cinema, Octavio bumps into Julieta who takes him home to hide. Julieta and her husband Ignacio are old friends of Octavio as they had been student activists together. Despite agreeing to help, Ignacio is resentful of Octavio because of the past relationship he had with Julieta. Octavio discovers that it is an unhappy marriage, Ignacio has a mistress while Julieta is forced to work as a taxi dancer in a cabaret to make ends meet.

Julieta shoots dead a government spy who has discovered Octavio's location. She helps Octavio reach a train which will enable him to go to Mexico City and present evidence exposing the Governor. Julieta plans to elope with him, but at the last moment turns back to stay with Ignacio.

Cast
 Andrea Palma as Julieta
 Pedro Armendáriz as Octavio
 Alberto Galán as Ignacio Elizalde
 Narciso Busquets as Juanito
 Maruja Grifell as Ruiz's wife
 Manuel Arvide as Gunman
 Lucila Bowling as Gloria
 Manuel Dondé as Gunman
 Gaspar Henaine as Train assistant

References

Bibliography
 Mora, Carl J. Mexican Cinema: Reflections of a Society. University of California Press, 1989.

External links
 

1943 films
1940s thriller drama films
Mexican thriller drama films
Film noir
1940s Spanish-language films
Films directed by Julio Bracho
Films set in Mexico
Films shot in Mexico
Mexican black-and-white films
1943 drama films
1940s Mexican films